Goshen Reservoir is a small reservoir located in Utah County, Utah. It is an impoundment of Currant Creek downstream from Mona Reservoir.  It is owned and maintained by the Goshen Irrigation Co.

Reservoirs in Utah
Buildings and structures in Utah County, Utah
Lakes of Utah County, Utah